Sherie Scheer (born 1940) is an American photographer. Long active in Venice, Los Angeles, she is known for her hand-colored panoramic photographs, although she later turned to fantasy portraiture.

Early life and education
Born in Estherville, Iowa, Scheer graduated from the University of California, Los Angeles with a bachelor's degree in 1969; she received a master's degree from that institution in 1971.

Collections
Center for Creative Photography 
Gallery van Haarlem
Metropolitan Museum of Art
Portland Art Museum the National Gallery of Australia, 
Seattle Art Museum
Smithsonian American Art Museum

References

1940 births
Living people
20th-century American photographers
21st-century American photographers
People from Estherville, Iowa
Artists from Iowa
People from Venice, Los Angeles
Artists from Los Angeles
University of California, Los Angeles alumni
20th-century American women photographers
21st-century American women photographers